Frontline is an independent journal produced in support of the Scottish Socialist Party.  It aims to look at all aspects of politics, society and culture in Scotland and internationally. 

It was first produced in March 2001 as the theoretical journal of the International Socialist Movement, a platform of the SSP, however following the disbanding of the ISM in early 2006, it is currently published by a steering group composed of former members.  In March 2008 a decision was taken by the editorial board to relaunch the magazine as an independent journal, although it remains sympathetic to and supportive of the Scottish Socialist Party.

Topics which it has covered have included the internal issues of the SSP, coverage on the debate around Scottish Independence, gender equality, the Spanish Civil War and the anti-capitalist and anti-globalisation movement.  It has included eye witness accounts from the political struggles in Afghanistan and Argentina amongst other first hand reports.

References

External links
 Official website

2001 establishments in Scotland
Magazines established in 2001
Marxist magazines
Mass media in Glasgow
Political magazines published in Scotland
Publications associated with the Scottish Socialist Party
Socialist magazines